These are the team results from the Segunda División during the 2004–05 season.

Teams 

The 2004–05 Segunda División was made up of the following teams:

League table

Results

Final conclusion

Promoted to La Liga
Cádiz CF
Celta de Vigo
Deportivo Alavés

Promoted from Segunda División B
Segunda División Play-Off 2004-05:
 Hércules CF
 CD Castellón
 Lorca Deportiva
 Real Madrid Castilla

Relegated to Segunda División B
Pontevedra—Relegated to Segunda División B – Group 1
Salamanca—Relegated to Segunda División B – Group 2
Terrassa—Relegated to Segunda División B – Group 3
Córdoba CF—Relegated to Segunda División B – Group 4

Relegated from La Liga
Levante UD
CD Numancia
Albacete Balompié

Top scorers
Mario Bermejo (Racing de Ferrol): 25 goals
Dani Güiza (Ciudad de Murcia): 21 goals
Nino (Elche): 20 goals
Joseba Llorente (Eibar): 18 goals
Gorka Brit (Salamanca): 17 goals

Top goalkeepers
Armando (Cádiz): 28 goals in 40 matches
Juan José Valencia (Gimnàstic): 25 goals in 28 matches
José Manuel Pinto (Celta): 34 goals in 38 matches
Roberto (Sporting): 35 goals in 39 matches
Gorka Iraizoz (Eibar): 38 goals in 41 matches

Teams by Autonomous Community

Segunda División seasons
2004–05 in Spanish football leagues
Spain